Magnesium sulfite is the magnesium salt of sulfurous acid with the formula . Its most common hydrated form has 6 water molecules making it a hexahydrate, ·6. When heated above , it is dehydrated to magnesium sulfite trihydrate, or ·3. The anhydrous form is hygroscopic, meaning that it readily absorbs water from the air.

See also
Calcium sulfite
Magnesium sulfate (Epsom salt)

References
solubility tables of MgSO3 hydrates PDF

Magnesium compounds
Sulfites